Lucy Must Be Traded, Charlie Brown is the 42nd prime-time animated television special based upon the popular comic strip Peanuts, by Charles M. Schulz. It originally aired on the ABC network on August 29, 2003.

It was released on VHS and DVD on March 2, 2004, and again on May 1, 2012, as part of a single disc called Happiness is...Peanuts: Team Snoopy.

Plot
It's the beginning of baseball season, and Charlie Brown is looking forward to the new season with a mixture of joy and apprehension.  The apprehension is mainly due to Lucy, who is constantly bothering him with idiotic questions, sarcastic remarks and non-sequiturs, to the point where Charlie Brown literally becomes physically ill on the pitcher's mound.

After his team loses their first game to Peppermint Patty's team, Charlie Brown then thinks of a great idea of trading one of his team players to Peppermint Patty. He decides to trade Snoopy for five of Peppermint Patty's players (because Snoopy is the only player Patty would want). However, the team is angry with Charlie Brown for this, and Charlie Brown finally decides to rip up the contract made for the trade, which is just as well, as it turns out the five players whom Patty was to trade would rather give up baseball than play for Charlie Brown. 

The team continues to play throughout the season "normally" before Schroeder plants the idea in Charlie Brown's mind to get rid of Lucy. Peppermint Patty, having problems with an unmotivated Marcie, suggests to Charlie Brown a trade, which Charlie Brown seizes to give away Lucy in exchange for Marcie (and a pizza). Marcie, however, chooses to not play at her position but spend the entire game next to her crush, Charlie Brown, on the pitcher's mound. Meanwhile, Lucy, over on Peppermint Patty's squad, gets into her usual fuss-budget business by failing Peppermint Patty at every game the team plays by doing something stupid. Peppermint Patty finally has had enough and asks Charlie Brown for the trade to be reversed, which Charlie Brown agrees to do, though he admits that he had already eaten the pizza included in the trade. 

Once Lucy is returned, Charlie Brown starts to regain confidence when suddenly the game is brought to an end by a downpour, flooding the field so much that Lucy sails through it on a small motorboat. This causes Charlie Brown to finally concede defeat, lamenting on the pitcher's mound through the credits before walking home.

Source material
The storyline involving Snoopy's botched trade to Peppermint Patty's team was based on a lengthy Peanuts storyline from the fall of 1967. The storyline involving Lucy's and Marcie's trades originated in a storyline from 1988.

Of note is the fact that Peppermint Patty refers to Snoopy as "that funny-looking kid with a big nose," which is in line with the content of Peanuts in 1967 when the original strips were drawn. In the actual strip, Peppermint Patty did not learn Snoopy was a dog until 1974 and never referred to him as a "kid with a big nose" afterwards.

Voice cast
Serena Berman as Lucy van Pelt
Wesley Singerman as Charlie Brown
Corey Padnos as Linus van Pelt
Daniel Hansen as Peppermint Patty
Melissa Montoya as Marcie
Megan Taylor Harvey as Sally Brown
Christopher Ryan Johnson as Schroeder
Bill Melendez as Snoopy and Woodstock
Frieda and Pig-Pen also appear, but are silent.

References

External links

Peanuts television specials
Television shows directed by Bill Melendez
American Broadcasting Company television specials
2003 television specials
2000s American television specials
2000s animated television specials
Baseball animation
American baseball films